The ColorMonitor IIe, later renamed AppleColor Composite Monitor IIe is a CRT-based color or gray monochrome (selectable) 13-inch monitor manufactured by Apple Computer for the Apple II personal computer family.  This monitor is designed to fit into the grooves on the top of the Apple II, II+, and IIe computers. This monitor has no swiveling option.

References 
 Apple ColorMonitor Installation Manual (1985) - English/French/German/Italian/Spanish

Apple II peripherals
Apple Inc. displays